The 2012 Bank of America 500 was a NASCAR Sprint Cup Series stock car race held on October 13, 2012, at Charlotte Motor Speedway in Concord, North Carolina. Contested over 334 laps on the 1.5-mile (2.4 km) asphalt quad-oval, it was the thirty-first race of the 2012 Sprint Cup Series season, as well as the fifth race in the ten-race Chase for the Sprint Cup, which ends the season.

Clint Bowyer of Michael Waltrip Racing won the race, his third of the season, while Denny Hamlin finished second and Jimmie Johnson was third.

This was the first race since the 1979 Southern 500 in which is not featuring the name Earnhardt on the grid and for the first time since the 1999 Pennzoil 400 in which Dale Earnhardt Jr is absent on the grid.

Report

Background

Charlotte Motor Speedway is one of ten  intermediate tracks to hold NASCAR races; the others are Atlanta Motor Speedway, Kansas Speedway, Chicagoland Speedway, Darlington Raceway, Homestead Miami Speedway, New Hampshire Motor Speedway, Kentucky Speedway, Las Vegas Motor Speedway, and Texas Motor Speedway. The track's turns are banked at twenty-four degrees, while the front stretch, the location of the finish line, is five degrees. The back stretch, opposite of the front, also had a five degree banking. The racetrack has seats for 140,000 spectators.

Before the race, Brad Keselowski led the Drivers' Championship with 2,179 points, and Jimmie Johnson stood in second with 2,165 points. Denny Hamlin followed in third with 2,156 points, thirteen points ahead of Kasey Kahne and seventeen ahead of Clint Bowyer in fourth and fifth. Jeff Gordon with 2,137 was four points ahead of Tony Stewart, as Martin Truex Jr. with 2,131 points, was one point ahead of Greg Biffle and Kevin Harvick. Dale Earnhardt Jr. and Matt Kenseth was eleventh and twelfth with 2,128 and 2,117 points, respectively.

In the Manufacturers' Championship, Chevrolet was leading with 203 points, twenty-seven points ahead of Toyota. Ford, with 147 points, was thirteen points ahead of Dodge in the battle for third. Matt Kenseth is the defending race winner after winning the event in 2011.

On October 11, 2012, Hendrick Motorsports announced that Earnhardt Jr. would not participate in the race because of being diagnosed with a concussion one day earlier. Instead, Regan Smith, who was supposed to drive for the Phoenix Racing, would replace Earnhardt Jr., while A. J. Allmendinger would be the interim driver for Smith. Earnhardt Jr. reported that he experienced concussion symptoms after a crash at Kansas Speedway during a tire test on August 29, 2012. He claimed that he had no symptoms before the Good Sam Roadside Assistance 500, but after being involved in the Big One on the final lap, he reported having concussion symptoms that lasted more than three days later, convincing him to see a neurologist, who said that Earnhardt Jr. needed to miss the next two races because of a concussion. It was the first time since the 1979 Southern 500 (the last race his father missed after an accident at Pocono in his rookie season) that a Sprint Cup race did not have an Earnhardt in the field, and the first race in the modern era that did not have a driver from North Carolina in the field, as Scott Riggs, the only North Carolina driver entered, failed to qualify.

Practice and qualifying
Three practice sessions were held over the course of the race weekend. The first, held on Thursday, October 11, was used to set the qualifying order. The session was led by Denny Hamlin with a time of 28.170 seconds. Mark Martin was second, only .037 seconds behind Hamlin, with Matt Kenseth in third .016 seconds behind Martin.  Joey Logano and Gordon completed the top five, while Kyle Busch, Regan Smith, Kasey Kahne, Jimmie Johnson, and Brad Keselowski completed the top 10.

Qualifying was held after the first practice session. 47 cars took 2 qualifying laps to set the 43 car field. Greg Biffle would win the pole position, setting a track record with a lap of 27.877 seconds, breaking the old track record set by Elliott Sadler in 2005. After being awarded the pole, Biffle proclaimed his excitement during the lap. "I was super excited about that lap because I drove it farther into Turn 1 than I thought would work," Mark Martin would claim the outside pole, Ryan Newman claimed the third position, and Chase drivers Bowyer, Johnson, Truex Jr., Kenseth, Hamlin, and Kahne rounded out the top 10. 

A second practice was held on Friday, with Greg Biffle leading the pack with a time of 28.867. Kahne, Harvick, Johnson, Martin, Truex Jr., Keselowski, Smith, Newman, and Gordon completed the top 10. Happy Hour was also held on Friday, led by Kyle Busch.

Race
The race was held under clear conditions with light winds. Pre-race ceremonies began with the Air Force ROTC Detachment 592 from UNC-Charlotte. K-LOVE CEO Mike Novak then delivered the invocation, followed by gospel group NewSong delivering the National Anthem. At 7:40, Wounded Warrior Project executive vice president Dave Nevins gave the command to start engines. Ryan Newman, Juan Pablo Montoya, Jeff Burton, and Reed Sorenson went to the rear of the field due to engine changes, while Travis Kvapil and David Gilliland went to the back for unapproved transmission changes. The race started at 7:50, with front row starters Biffle and Martin running side by side for the first 4 laps of the race, with Biffle clearing Martin in turn 4. The first caution came out when Chase driver Matt Kenseth had a left rear tire go down, resulting in him spinning in turn 4 on lap 11.

On the lap 15 restart, Biffle continued to lead when David Ragan, Jeff Burton, and Tony Stewart all collided.

Results

Qualifying

Race results

Standings after the race

Drivers' Championship standings

Manufacturers' Championship standings

Note: Only the top five positions are included for the driver standings.

References

NASCAR races at Charlotte Motor Speedway
Bank of America 500
Bank of America 500
Bank of America 500